Pocharam is a satellite town of Hyderabad and municipality in Medchal–Malkajigiri district, Telangana, India.

Economy
The presence of Warangal highway and metro station at Uppal has led to large scale boom in real-estate activity in and adjoining areas of Narapally, Boduppal and Peerzadiguda. It is home to integrated residential and commercial project, Singapore Township aka Sanskruthi Township. The software company, Infosys, has its 447-acre second campus in Hyderabad, here known as Prakriti Park. This facility is an SEZ and, when constructed fully, it will be able to accommodate 25,000 employees. The campus is Infosys' world's biggest campus. Next to this is Raheja Mind Space IT Park in 100 acres. Companies like Genpact, Axis Bank and other IT and ITES companies have set up their offices in Raheja Mind Space.

References

Villages in Ranga Reddy district